Year 1208 (MCCVIII) was a leap year starting on Tuesday (link will display the full calendar) of the Julian calendar.

Events 
By place 

 Asia 
The government provides temporary lodging for 5,345 people, in nearby Buddhist and Taoist monasteries. The collective victims of the disaster are given 160,000 strings of cash, along with 400 tons of rice. Some of the government officials who lost their homes take up residence in rented boathouses, on the nearby West Lake.

 Europe 
 January 15 – Pierre de Castelnau is murdered by heretics supported by Raymond VI, count of Toulouse. He is held responsible and excommunicated by Pope Innocent III, leading to the Albigensian Crusade.
 January 31 – Battle of Lena: Swedish forces under King Eric X defeat the invading Danish army (some 12,000 men). King Sverker II (the Younger) is deposed as king of Sweden and is succeeded by Eric X.
 Livonian Crusade: The Crusader Livonian Brothers of the Sword, supported by tribes of Livs and Letts, initiate raids into Ugandi County in southern Estonia, resulting in the Estonian fight for independence.
 March 24 – Innocent III places England under an interdict, as punishment for King John (Lackland) for refusing to accept Stephen Langton as archbishop of Canterbury. During the interdict, religious services as marriages, burials, or baptisms cannot be performed. John confiscates church property of clergy who are unwilling to conduct services. Many bishops in the country flee abroad to the Continent.
 Autumn – William Marshal is recalled and humiliated by John (Lackland) at court in London, while John gives his justiciar in Ireland, Meiler Fitzhenry the order to invade Marshal's lands, burning the town of New Ross.
 June 21 – Philip of Swabia, king of Germany, is assassinated in Bamberg by the German count Otto of Wittelsbach, because Philip has refused to give him his 10-year-old daughter Beatrice in marriage.
 June 30 – Battle of Philippopolis: Bulgarian forces under Emperor (tsar) Boril are defeated by the Latin army (some 30,000 men) led by Emperor Henry of Flanders, near modern-day Plovdiv, Bulgaria.
 August 27 – Queen Irene Angelina dies in childbirth after the death of her husband Philip of Swabia at Hohenstaufen Castle. Leaving behind four daughters Beatrice, Maria, Kunigunde, and Elisabeth.
 November 11 – Otto IV is elected by the German nobles as king of Germany at Frankfurt. He is engaged to Beatrice and travels to Milan where he receives the Iron Crown and the title of King of Italy, which continues until the end of World War I in 1918.

 By topic 

 Literature 
 Robert of Courçon, an English cardinal, writes his Summa – devoted to questions of canon law and ethics – dealing at length with the question of usury.

 Religion 
 November 17 – Innocent III asks the nobles in Northern France to take military action (the so-called Albigensian Crusade) against the Cathars in Languedoc.

Births 
 February 2 – James I, (the Conqueror), king of Aragon (d. 1276)
 Ada of Holland, Dutch noblewoman and abbess (d. 1258)
 Berke Khan, Mongol ruler of the Golden Horde (d. 1266)
 Bolesław I of Masovia, Polish nobleman and knight (d. 1248)
 Coloman of Galicia, Hungarian prince of Halych (d. 1241)
 Gissur Þorvaldsson, Icelandic chieftain (or goði) (d. 1268)
 Kolbeinn ungi Arnórsson, Icelandic chieftain (d. 1245) 
 Knut Haakonsson, Norwegian nobleman (jarl) (d. 1261) 
 Margaret Skulesdatter, queen consort of Norway (d. 1270)
 Sempad the Constable, Armenian nobleman (d. 1276) 
 Simon V (de Montfort), English nobleman (d. 1265)
 Thomas de Beaumont, English nobleman (d. 1242)

Deaths 
 January 15 – Pierre de Castelnau, French priest (assassinated)
 January 28 – Julian of Cuenca, Spanish bishop (b. 1127) 
 February 18 – Mark ibn Kunbar, Egyptian Coptic priest
 April 22 – Philip of Poitou (or Poitiers), bishop of Durham
 June 21 – Philip of Swabia, king of Germany (b. 1177)
 August 27 – Irene Angelina, queen of Sicily and Germany
 August 29 – Dietrich II (von Kittlitz), bishop of Meissen
 October 6 – Geoffrey de Muschamp, bishop of Coventry
 November 9 – Sancha of Castile, queen consort of Aragon
 December 29 – Zhang Zong, Chinese emperor (b. 1168)
 Bridget Haraldsdotter, queen of Sweden (approximate date)
 Ermengol VIII (or Armengol), count of Urgell (b. 1158)
 Kolbeinn Tumason, Icelandic chieftain and poet (b. 1173)
 Knut Birgersson, Swedish nobleman (jarl) and knight
 Leo Sgouros (or Sgurus), Byzantine governor and despot
 Peter of Angoulême, Latin bishop and patriarch of Antioch
 William IV of Forcalquier, French nobleman (b. 1130)
 Ya'qub ibn Ishaq al-Israili, Egyptian Jewish physician

References